Angela Martini (born Angjela Martini; 23 May 1986) is an Albanian-Swiss model, beauty pageant winner, life coach, movie producer, and author. She won Miss Universe Albania in 2010.

Early life 
Angela Martini was born in Shkodër, Albania in 1986. During this time there was political instability as communism entered the region. She grew up in poverty and suffered a difficult childhood. Concerned for her safety, her mother sent her to Switzerland to live with her father at the age of ten. She then moved to the United States (Miami) at the age of 21.

Personal life and career 
After moving to Miami, Martini began modeling and participating in pageants. After moving to New York and Los Angeles, Martini became a life coach, movie producer, and wrote her debut biography.

Modeling
Martini has been modeling since she was 18, but her career took off after she moved to Miami at the age of 21. She is signed with NEXT Model Management in Miami, Florida, and Elite Model Management in New York City. Once in America, Martini quickly started booking campaigns with retail giants such as JCPenney and Macy's. Martini also worked with GQ, Maxim, and Esquire. She has appeared in Mercedes-Benz Fashion Week,  Mercedes-Benz Fashion Week Miami as well as in Radar Online, OK Magazine, and Star Magazine's "Spotted" columns. Martini modeled in the 2008 edition of Sports Illustrated Swimsuit Issue and was interviewed for the February 2011 issue of Esquire.

Pageantry
Martini competed in the 2010 Miss Universe pageant in Las Vegas, Nevada, placing 6th with a score of 8.693. She currently holds the record for the highest-placed Miss Universe Albania in history.

Interviews
In August 2019, Trend Prive Magazine spoke with Martini about her journey from being a model to venturing into being an author and licensed life coach.  Angela Martini also spoke with Viva Glam Magazine, Paraeles, Women Fitness, Trend Prive Magazine, Haute Living, Times of India, Thrive Global, and others about her modeling, Miss Universe competition, becoming a life coach, as well as the launch of her Biography.

Life Coach
In 2017, Angela Martini became a certified Life Coach.

Author
In 2019, Angela Martini wrote her debut book "Love. Hope. Light".

Filmography 
In 2019, Angela Martini debuted as a producer in A Way Out (2018) and then produced The Fusion (2020).

Bibliography 
 Love. Hope. Light. (2019)

References

Photos

External links

Living people
Miss Universe 2010 contestants
1986 births
Albanian female models
Albanian beauty pageant winners
People from Shkodër
Albanian emigrants to the United States
21st-century Albanian models
Albanian Roman Catholics